Barak (lightning) is an Israeli surface-to-air missile (SAM) designed to be used as a ship-borne point-defense missile system against aircraft, anti-ship missiles, and UAVs.

Overview
The Barak SAM system is designed to replace or complement gun-based CIWS platforms, such as the Phalanx CIWS, with a more flexible and longer-range SAM.
The missiles are mounted in an eight cell container (which requires little maintenance) and are launched straight up. The Barak SAM system's launcher uses a compact vertical launching system, with an 8-cell module weighing . Fire control is provided by an equally compact C3I system that weighs , which can either operate independently or in conjunction with other on-board sensors. Each Barak system (missile container, radar, computers and installation) costs about $24 million. The system is designed to defend against aircraft and anti-ship missiles, including sea-skimming missiles.

Flight tests 
The missile was tested on 24 March 2017 by the Indian Navy from  during Operation Readiness Inspection in the Arabian Sea.

Operators

Current operators

 - On 14 warships, including the s and the aircraft carrier . This system is already deployed on the Indian navy's third aircraft carrier .

Allegations

The alleged Indian Barak missile purchase controversy was mainly due to allegations of defense industry corruption, and also due to allegations that the deal was over-priced and processed on a single-tender basis. By 2013, the allegations were unproven and the investigations were inconclusive due to lack of evidence, and the case is likely to be closed.

The investigation of the allegations began in 2006, and were done by the Central Bureau of Investigation, which arrested several people including the former Samata Party treasurer R.K. Jain.

See also
 Tor missile system
 Sea Wolf (missile)
 Barak 8
 VL-SRSAM

References

External links

Barak 1 on IAI website
Barak 1 on Rafael website
Barak 1 brochure on Rafael website

Surface-to-air missiles of Israel
Naval surface-to-air missiles
IAI missiles
Close-in weapon systems
21st-century surface-to-air missiles
MLM products